Gajsinghpur is a town near the border area in Sri Ganganagar district in the Indian state of Rajasthan. Census of 2011 is 9995.

Demographics
 India census, Gajsinghpur had a population of 9507. Males constitute 54% of the population and females 46%. Gajsinghpur has an average literacy rate of 64%, higher than the national average of 59.5%: male literacy is 69%, and female literacy is 58%. In Gajsinghpur, 14% of the population is under 6 years of age. It is a small agricultural marketplace near the Pakistan border. Popular crops traded here are wheat, cotton, narama and mustard. Land prices are between 4 lakh to 9 lakh per bigga.

Transportation 
The Delhi Sarai Rohilla Bikaner Superfast Express is a direct train service (train no. 12455/56) from Delhi Sarai Rohilla railway station to Bikaner via Gajsinghpur.

A few passenger trains from Sri Ganganagar to Suratgarh go via Gajsinghpur. Trains come from Hanumangarh Junction to here.

References

Cities and towns in Sri Ganganagar district